Tugimaantee 87 (ofcl. abbr. T87), also called the Põlva ring road, is the ring road of Põlva. It starts at the intersection of national roads 62 and 89 on the west side of town and runs north and east of Põlva through the intersections of roads 61 and 62 to the southeast side of the town to road 90. The length of the road is 6.0 kilometers.

See also
 Transport in Estonia

References

External links

N87
Ring roads in Estonia